This is a list of members of the second parliament of the South Australian House of Assembly, which sat from 27 April 1860 until 22 October 1862. The members were elected at the 1860 colonial election.

1 The Burra and Clare MHA William Lennon was declared insolvent and thus ineligible to serve as a member of parliament on 28 March 1861. George Kingston won the resulting by-election on 6 May.
2 West Torrens MHA George Morphett resigned on 15 April 1861. Randolph Isham Stow won the resulting by-election on 30 April.
3 City of Adelaide MHA Richard Hanson resigned on 20 November 1861. James Boucaut won the resulting by-election on 9 December.
4 Gumeracha MHA Alexander Hay resigned on 30 December 1861. Alexander Murray won the resulting by-election on 8 May 1862.
5 City of Adelaide MHA Thomas Reynolds resigned on 17 February 1862. He subsequently nominated for the resulting by-election and was re-elected to his seat on 2 May.
6 The Murray MHA David Wark died on 3 March 1862. Allan McFarlane won the resulting by-election on 8 May. The seat of The Murray was subsumed into Mount Barker at the close of this parliament.
7 Port Adelaide MHA William Owen resigned on 22 March 1862. John Hart won the resulting by-election on 8 May.
8 The Burra and Clare MHA William Dale resigned on 22 March 1862. John Bentham Neales won the resulting by-election on 8 May.
9 Light MHA Francis Dutton resigned on 22 April 1862. John Rowe won the resulting by-election on 8 May.

References
Statistical Record of the Legislature 1836–2007, Parliament of SA, www.parliament.sa.gov.au

Members of South Australian parliaments by term
19th-century Australian politicians